In astronomy, first light is the first use of a telescope (or, in general, a new instrument) to take an astronomical image after it has been constructed. This is often not the first viewing using the telescope; optical tests will probably have been performed to adjust the components.

Characteristics
The first light image is normally of little scientific interest and is of poor quality, since the various telescope elements are yet to be adjusted for optimum efficiency. Despite this, a first light is always a moment of great excitement, both for the people who design and build the telescope and for the astronomical community, who may have anticipated the moment for many years while the telescope was under construction. A well-known and spectacular astronomical object is usually chosen as a subject.

Historical examples

The famous  Hale Telescope of Palomar Observatory saw first light on 26 January 1949, targeting NGC 2261 under the direction of American astronomer Edwin Powell Hubble.  The image was published in many magazines and is available on Caltech Archives.

The Isaac Newton Telescope had two first lights: one in England in 1965 with its original mirror, and another in 1984 at La Palma island. The second first light was done with a video camera that showed the Crab Pulsar flashing.

Elation at first light images by the Hubble Space Telescope in 1990 soon gave way to initial disappointment when a flaw prevented adjustments for proper operation. The expected first light image quality was finally achieved after a 1993 servicing mission by Space Shuttle Endeavour.

The Large Binocular Telescope had its first light with a single primary mirror on 12 October 2005, which was a view of NGC 891. The second primary mirror was installed in January 2006 and became fully operational in January 2008.

The  Gran Telescopio Canarias had a first light image of Tycho 1205081 on 14 July 2007.

The IRIS solar space observatory achieved first light on 17 July 2013. The PI noted: "The quality of images and spectra we are receiving from IRIS is amazing. This is just what we were hoping for ..."

On 4 February 2022, the first light viewed by the James Webb Space Telescope (JWST) was from the star HD 84406 for the purpose of testing and aligning the focus of the telescope's 18 mirrors. On 11 February 2022. The New York Times reported that "first light" images from the James Webb Space Telescope were released - as well as a related NASA alignment video (2/11/2022; 3:00). On 6 July 2022, NASA released a test image from the JWST's Fine Guidance Sensor. NASA released the first official JWST image on 11 July 2022. Later, in an official ceremony, the first collection of five JWST science images were released on Tuesday, 12 July 2022 (NASA-TV live; 10:30 am/et/usa).

Gallery

References 

Telescopes
 
Astronomical imaging